Anatomy is a 2000 German horror film written and directed by Stefan Ruzowitzky that stars Franka Potente. The film became the highest-grossing German-language movie in 2000. Columbia Pictures released the film's English-dubbed version in the United States theatrically. However, the dubbed version under-performed at the United States box office.

A sequel, Anatomy 2 (Anatomie 2) was released in 2003.

Plot
Medical student Paula Henning wins a place in a summer course at the University of Heidelberg, where her grandfather had been a renowned professor. During one of her classes on anatomy, the body of David, a young man whom Paula encountered on her train to Heidelberg, turns up on her dissection table. Paula's instructor, Professor Grombek, humiliates her by daring her to dissect the heart. Paula finds that David's body bears strange incisions, and decides to investigate the mysterious circumstances surrounding his death. As she proceeds to cut a sample for an independent test, she is intrigued to find a triple "A" mark near David's ankle. She is then startled by the school's mortuary attendant, who wants to know if Professor Grombek is aware of her acts.

Paula finds clues pointing to an ancient secret society, the Anti-Hippocratic Society, which performs gruesome experiments on living people who they deem undesirable. Paula also comes across research about the rituals that they perform on transgressors of their rules, or those who inquire too much. One night, Paula sits on her bed and realizes it has been soaked in blood, with candles lit underneath, as a sign of warning from the Society. She then attacks a figure that enters her room, but it turns out to be her friend Hein, who is seeking consolation over his recent breakup from his girlfriend Gretchen, who has since started seeing Phil, another student. While they talk, Casper, Paula's romantic interest, stops by and is upset that she is not alone and storms off. Hein leaves, apparently more at peace.

As Gretchen and Phil prepare to have sex in one of the morgue halls, Hein murders Phil in a jealous rage. He then injects Gretchen with poison, telling her that he will preserve her body. He is so absorbed in the work that he falls asleep without having disposed of Phil’s body. Hein hides it in the morgue and removes the head to prevent identification. When Paula tries to share her findings about the Society with Hein the next day, he menacingly tells her it's dangerous to know too much. Grombek reveals that her grandfather was a member, and that the drug he became famous for developing was the result of his experiments in Nazi concentration camps. She flees to the hospital to confront her grandfather, but is told that he has died.

At the assembly of the Society, Hein expresses no remorse for the murders and defiantly accepts their punishment, slashing himself three times in the face. Grombek takes responsibility for the killings and leaves to call the authorities to arrest Hein. Later, while Paula destroys the diplomas granted to her grandfather, a crazed Hein kills Grombek in his house. Paula gets back to the school but is trapped by Hein and his accomplice, Ludwig. While they are preparing her for preservation, her bindings are partially cut by Casper. Paula gets loose, poisons Ludwig, and runs away until Hein strikes a high voltage cable and dies. Casper and Paula then escape together.

Halfway through the end credits, a sequence shows two of Paula's classmates praising Hein's abilities in dissection and preservation, discussing Grombek's imminent replacement, and how in their respective practices they will keep a low profile while experimenting for the Anti-Hippocratic Society.

Cast
 Franka Potente as Paula Henning
 Benno Fürmann as Hein
 Rüdiger Vogler as Dr. Henning
 Anna Loos as Gretchen
 Oliver Wnuk as Ludwig
 Arndt Schwering-Sohnrey as David
 Sebastian Blomberg as Caspar
 Holger Speckhahn as Phil
 Traugott Buhre as Prof. Grombek
 Gennadi Vengerov as the Preparateur

Reception

On Metacritic, the film has a weighted average score of 33 out of 100, based on 4 critics, indicating "Generally unfavorable reviews".

Dennis Schwartz from Ozus' World Movie Reviews gave the film a grade B, calling it "both eerily written and directed". Stephen Holden from The New York Times gave the film a negative review, stating that the film "lacks the raucous, anything-for-a-shock carnival humor of its American prototypes".

See also
Plastination

References

External links
 
 
 
 

2000 films
2000 horror films
2000 psychological thriller films
2000s slasher films
2000s German-language films
German psychological thriller films
German horror films
German horror thriller films
German slasher films
Films set in universities and colleges
Films shot in Germany
Films set in Germany
Columbia Pictures films
Films directed by Stefan Ruzowitzky
2000s horror thriller films
2000s German films